Doran is an unincorporated community and census-designated place in Tazewell County, Virginia, United States. Doran is located along the Clinch River, U.S. Route 460 and Virginia State Route 67 between Richlands and Raven. Doran has a post office with ZIP code 24612. The community was named for Joseph I. Doran, who was the general counsel for the Norfolk and Western Railway. It was first listed as a CDP in the 2020 census with a population of 9,874.

References

Unincorporated communities in Tazewell County, Virginia
Unincorporated communities in Virginia
Census-designated places in Tazewell County, Virginia
Census-designated places in Virginia